Hadley Wood & Wingate Football Club was a football club based in the Finchley area of London, England. They played at Wingate & Finchley's Harry Abrahams Stadium.

History
The club was established as a youth team in 2003, and was a feeder club for Wingate & Finchley. In 2015 an adult team was formed and joined the Premier Division of the Hertfordshire Senior County League. They finished fourth in their first season, and were promoted to Division One of the Spartan South Midlands League. They left the league and disbanded at the end of the 2016–17 season.

References

Defunct football clubs in England
Defunct football clubs in London
2003 establishments in England
Association football clubs established in 2003
Hertfordshire Senior County League
Spartan South Midlands Football League
2017 disestablishments in England
Association football clubs disestablished in 2017
Sport in the London Borough of Barnet